The Neiba agave sphaero (Sphaerodactylus schuberti), also known commonly as the Neiba agave geckolet and Schubert's least gecko, is a species of lizard in the family Sphaerodactylidae. The species is endemic to the Dominican Republic.

Etymology
The specific name, schuberti, is in honor of German zoologist Andreas Schubert.

Habitat

Reproduction
S. schuberti is oviparous.

References

Further reading
Rösler H (2000). "Kommentierte Liste der rezent, subrezent und fossil bekannten Geckotaxa (Reptilia: Gekkonomorpha)". Gekkota 2: 28–153. (Sphaerodactylus schuberti, p. 114). (in German).
Thomas R, Hedges SB (1998). "A New Gecko from the Sierra de Neiba of Hispaniola (Squamata: Gekkonidae: Sphaerodactylus)". Herpetologica 54 (3): 333–336.

Sphaerodactylus
Endemic fauna of the Dominican Republic
Reptiles of the Dominican Republic
Reptiles described in 1998
Taxa named by Stephen Blair Hedges